Rosemary Milgate (born 5 April 1959) is an Australian former swimmer. She competed in two events at the 1976 Summer Olympics.

References

External links
 

1959 births
Living people
Australian female freestyle swimmers
Olympic swimmers of Australia
Swimmers at the 1976 Summer Olympics
Place of birth missing (living people)
Commonwealth Games medallists in swimming
Commonwealth Games bronze medallists for Australia
Swimmers at the 1974 British Commonwealth Games
Medallists at the 1974 British Commonwealth Games